Pseudeboda africana is a species of moth of the family Tortricidae. It is found in South Africa.

References

Endemic moths of South Africa
Moths described in 1964
Tortricini
Taxa named by Józef Razowski
Moths of Africa